The Bund Deutscher Frauenvereine (Federation of German Women's Associations) (BDF) was founded on 28/29 March 1894 as umbrella organization of the women's civil rights feminist movement and existed until the Nazi seizure of power in 1933.

Its creation was inspired by the founding of the World's Congress of Representative Women meeting on the occasion of the 1893 World's Columbian Exposition in Chicago. Several women from Germany attended this event: Anna Simson, Hanna Bieber-Böhm, Auguste Förster, Käthe Schirmacher. They took the example of the American  National Council of Women as a model for the BDF. The International Council of Women also played a role in strengthening the co-operation between the NCW and the BDF.

Governance

The first board was composed of:
 Auguste Schmidt 
 Anna Schepeler-Lette, Chairperson of the Latvian Club
 Anna Simson
 Hanna Bieber-Böhm as chairwoman of the association for the protection of minors Representative of the morality movement
 Auguste Förster
 Ottilie Hoffmann, temperance activist
 Helene von Forster, chairwoman of the Nuremberg Association Women's Welfare
 Helene Lange
 Betty Naue
In 1896 they were joined by:
 Jeanette Schwerin, Head of girls and women's groups for social work
 Marie Stritt, Founder of the first legal protection association for women in Germany

Constituent groups
Among others, the Reifensteiner Association was among the members.

History

Wilhelmine period

Weimar period
The Nazi rise to power, in 1933, led to their with the assertion of control over women's associations. Such groups involving communists or socialists were forbidden, and members were arrested or even assassinated in rare cases.  All associations were asked to turn in Jewish members, including the Union of Protestant Women, the Association for Home and Countryside, the Union of German Colonial Women, and the Union of Queen Louise. But soon, the majority of the organizations disbanded or chose among themselves to disappear, like the BDF which dissolved in 1933 to avoid being controlled. Some of the affiliated associations joined the Deutsches Frauenwerk.

Membership 
Membership steadily grew in the first twenty years:
 1895 : 65 chapters
 1901 : 137 chapters and 70,000 members
 1913 : 2200 chapters and 500,000 members

Articles 
 Women in the Third Reich
 Deutsches Frauenwerk
 Frauenschaft

References 

Feminism in Germany
Organizations of the German Empire
Organizations based in the Weimar Republic
Women's organisations based in Germany
1894 establishments in Germany
Organizations established in 1894
1933 disestablishments in Germany
Organizations disestablished in 1933